Miguel Ángel Zavala (born 13 April 1961) is a Mexican diver. He competed in the men's 10 metre platform event at the 1984 Summer Olympics.

References

External links
 

1961 births
Living people
Mexican male divers
Olympic divers of Mexico
Divers at the 1984 Summer Olympics
Place of birth missing (living people)